Daliah Lavi (born Daliah Lewinbuk or Levenbuch,  ; 12 October 1942 – 3 May 2017) was an Israeli actress, singer, and model.

Biography
Daliah Lewinbuk (or Levenbuch) was born in Shavei Tzion, British Mandate of Palestine (now Israel), the daughter of Ruth and Reuben Lewinbuk (or Levenbuch), who were of German-Jewish and Russian-Jewish descent, respectively.

At age 10 she met Kirk Douglas, who was in Israel to film The Juggler, and told him she would like to be a dancer. Douglas helped persuade her parents to send her to Stockholm, Sweden to study ballet. Not suited to the climate, she would give up dancing and return to Israel to model. She performed her national service as a goodwill ambassador and appeared in several more films until on a trip to Rome she was spotted on a beach and offered a role in Two Weeks in Another Town, reuniting her with Douglas.

Career

In 1955 Lavi appeared in her first film, a Swedish adaptation of August Strindberg's 1887 novel The People of Hemsö. Returning to Israel, her career took off in 1960 when she started appearing in a large number of European and American productions. Fluent in several languages, she acted in films in German, French, Italian, Spanish and English.
Lavi was reunited with Douglas in her first American film, Vincente Minnelli's Two Weeks in Another Town (1962).

 

She appeared in Brunello Rondi's witch hunt-themed movie Il demonio (1963), a film she considered her best performance. She also appeared in Mario Bava's Gothic classic La Frusta e il corpo (1963), and the first Matt Helm film, The Silencers (1966), opposite Dean Martin. Her portrayal of The Girl, Peter O'Toole's love interest, in 1965's Lord Jim was to have been her breakout American role. But audiences' tepid reaction to the film prompted Lavi to accept a new career path, frequently playing a scantily clad femme fatale.

Lavi played European entertainer Ilona Bergen in the 1965 mystery film Ten Little Indians, a film adaptation of Agatha Christie's thriller  about a group of strangers with deadly secrets who are lured to an isolated locale and murdered one by one. She also acted as "The Detainer/007" in Casino Royale (1967).

She was subsequently discovered by record producer Jimmy Bowien and began  a successful schlager singing career in Germany, with hits such as "Oh, wann kommst du?", "Willst du mit mir gehn?" and "C'est ça, la vie (So ist das Leben)". 

In August 1971, her single "Jerusalem" peaked at number 98 in Australia.

Death
Lavi died on 3 May 2017, aged 74, from undisclosed causes in Asheville, North Carolina, US. Her funeral and burial were in Israel.

Filmography
 The People of Hemsö (1955) as Professor's Daughter
Burning Sands (1960) 
Candide ou l'optimisme au XXe siècle (1960) as Cunégonde
Estate Violenta (1961) as Marie
 (1961) as Nathalie Conrad
Three Faces of Sin (1961) (uncredited)
The Return of Doctor Mabuse (1961) as Maria Sabrehm
The Game of Truth (1961) as Gisèle
Two Weeks in Another Town (1962) as Veronica 
 (1962) as Germaine
Il demonio (1963) as Purif
The Whip and the Body (1963) as Nevenka Menliff
 (1963) as Secretary
Old Shatterhand (1964) as Paloma
Cyrano and d'Artagnan (1964) as Marion de l'Orme 
 (1965) as Lolita, Charlys Stiefschwester
Lord Jim (1965) as The Girl
La Celestina P... R... (1965) as Daniela
Shots in Threequarter Time (1965) as Irina Badoni
Ten Little Indians (1965) as Ilona Bergen
The Silencers (1966) as Tina
The Spy with a Cold Nose (1966) as Princess Natasha Romanova
Those Fantastic Flying Fools (1967) as Madelaine 
Casino Royale (1967) as The Detainer / James Bond
Jules Verne's Rocket to the Moon (1967) as Madelaine 
Nobody Runs Forever (1968) as Maria Cholon
Some Girls Do (1969) as Helga
Catlow (1971) as Rosita
Mrs. Harris und der Heiratsschwindler (1991) as Jill Howard

Discography
Liebeslied Jener Sommernacht  (1970) German / English
Daliah (1970) English
Daliah Lavi / In Liebe (1971) German
Sympathy (1971) English
Willst Du Mit Mir Geh'n (1971) German
Would You Follow Me (1971) English
Ich Bin Dein Freund (1972) German
Jerusalem (1972) English 
Meine Art Liebe Zu Zeigen (1972) German / English
Let The Love Grow (1973) English
I'm Israeli, I'm A Sabra (1974) Hebrew
Für Große Und Kleine Kinder (1975) German
Cafe Decadence (1975) German
Neuer Wind (1976) German
Bei Dir Bin Ich Immer Noch Zuhaus (1978) German
... Wenn Schon, Dann Intensiv (1983) German
Herzblut (1985) German

References

External links

 
 Daliah Lavi infosite
 Daliah Lavi profile at Aveleyman.com

1942 births
2017 deaths
20th-century Israeli actresses
Israeli emigrants to the United States
20th-century Israeli women singers
Israeli film actresses
Israeli Ashkenazi Jews
Israeli people of German-Jewish descent
Israeli people of Russian-Jewish descent
Ashkenazi Jews in Mandatory Palestine
People from Northern District (Israel)